Vladimir Nikolić (1857–1922), was a Serbian architect notable for his projects built in Vojvodina province. He mostly worked in Neo-renaissance, Neo-romanticic and Serbo-Byzantine Revival styles.

Biography
Nikolić finished elementary school in Senta, and continued his education in Pančevo, Maribor, Munich and later went on to Vienna and enrolled at the Polytechnic but did not finish his studies.

He spent nine years working on several projects in the Kingdom of Serbia, for which he was awarded Order of the Cross of Takovo by king Milan I of Serbia. In early 1892 Nikolić moved from Belgrade to Sremski Karlovci, which was the spiritual capital of Serbs of Vojvodina. At the behest of his godfather or cousin Patriarch Georgije Branković, he designed and built numerous buildings in Sremski Karlovci and other parts of Vojvodina, including the Patriarchate Court. Nikolić was an active hunter and winemaker.

The architecture of the Patriarch's Palace (1892) belongs to the neo-Renaissance and the Secession, although the author found his inspiration on the boundaries of the Renaissance, and among the Romantic and Byzantine symbols. After constructing the Bishop's Palace according to the principles of Theophil Hansen (1901), he remained faithful to the spirit of neo-Romanticism, the Byzantine tradition and the Secession.

Selected works

See also
 List of Serbian architects

References

Literature
Stončić, Donka, Arhitekt Vladimir Nikolić, Opštinski zavod za zaštitu spomenika kulture Novi Sad, 1999

1857 births
1922 deaths
Serbian architects
People from Senta